The Texas Electric Railway is a historic interurban railroad that operated from Dallas, Texas, to Denison, Corsicana, and Waco. It began operation in 1908 and through the merger of several companies became the largest interurban railway operator in the South before its demise in 1948.

History

In 1901 the Denison and Sherman Railway opened as the first interurban rail line in Texas, connecting the towns of Denison and Sherman with ten miles of track. This line was purchased in 1911 by the Texas Traction Company, who had constructed a sixty-five-mile line of their own from Dallas to Sherman and began operation in 1908. Seeing a need to expand in other directions, the owners of the Texas Traction Company purchased a twenty-eight-mile line from Dallas to Waxahachie in 1912. Built by the Dallas Southern Traction Company, the company became known as the Southern Traction Company and the rail line extended to Waco in 1913. A separate fifty-six-mile line from Dallas to Corsicana was also completed. In 1917 the Texas Traction Company and the Southern Traction Company merged to form the Texas Electric Railway Company and became the largest interurban railway in the South with more than 200 miles of track. The interurban became a vital link for communities until the popularity of the automobile caused a decline in revenue. The Dallas-Corsicana branch was discontinued in 1941 and the Dallas-Waco and Dallas-Denison branches closed in 1948.

Today
Today several pieces of infrastructure still remain. The Dallas Area Rapid Transit light rail system utilizes the right-of-way of the Texas Electric Railway for several of its lines, including the Red Line. The original Plano Station still serves as Downtown Plano station on the DART Red Line.

The wood frame passenger depot in downtown Plano and its attached brick electric transformer section remained in use until December 31, 1948. The Plano Station building now hosts the Interurban Railway Museum where a restored Texas Electric Railway car may be seen, and is listed in the National Register of Historic Places.

The Monroe Shops (1914), once the maintenance facility for Texas Electric's vehicles, was restored in 2011 and now serves as headquarters to the DART Police Department.

The Dallas Interurban Building (1916), once serving as the main Dallas depot, now houses residents and retail.

The Texas Electric Railway Allen Station still stands at 105 South Butler Drive.

References

Reading Bibliography
 Myers, J.J. and L.O. King. 1982. Texas Electric Railway.  Central Electric Railfans Association. Library of Congress Catalog Card #82-71474.
 Varney, R.  Texas Electric Album. Interurbans Special #62. .

External links
 

Defunct Texas railroads
Interurban railways in Texas